Hollywood Animal is a 2004 memoir by screenwriter, author and journalist Joe Eszterhas. It focuses on his childhood in refugee camps in Europe, moving to the US, growing up in Cleveland and working as a journalist for Rolling Stone magazine. It also covers his time in Hollywood, the break up of his first marriage and his battle against throat cancer.

It includes stories of the making of many of his films such as F.I.S.T., Flashdance, Jagged Edge and Basic Instinct.

References

External links
 Review at The New York Times

2004 non-fiction books
American memoirs